Neil's Harbour is an unincorporated area in the Municipality of the County of Victoria, Cape Breton Island, Nova Scotia, Canada.

Artifacts indicate that it have been originally settled by the Acadians. It is named after Neil McLennan.

The town has an operating Anglican church and a non-operational Presbyterian church.

The population is approximately 300 permanent residents. There are a few cottages, but mostly there are local residents who work in the lobster/crab and fishing industry.

The first school was constructed in 1878. The Cabot Education Centre lies on the west side of the village on the Cabot Trail.

Communities in Victoria County, Nova Scotia
General Service Areas in Nova Scotia